21S rRNA pseudouridine2819 synthase (Pus5p) is an enzyme with systematic name 21S rRNA-uridine2819 uracil mutase. This enzyme catalyses the following chemical reaction

 21S rRNA uridine2819  21S rRNA pseudouridine2819

The enzyme specifically acts on uridine2819 in 21S rRNA.

References

External links 
 

EC 5.4.99